The land of Odisha or former Kalinga has undergone several changes in terms of its boundaries since ancient ages. It was also known by different names like Odra Desha, Kalinga, Hirakhanda, Mahakantara or Utkala in different eras. Unlike other Ancient Kingdoms in India, Odisha for most part of the History remained a stable and major power till medieval era due to wide spread martial culture and prosperity brought by successive native ruling dynasties.

The year 1568 is considered a turning point in the history of Odisha. In 1568, Kalapahad invaded the state. This, aided by internal conflicts, led to a steady downfall of the state from which it did not recover.

Ancient period

Kalinga Kingdom (c. 1100 – 261 BCE) 

According to political scientist Sudama Misra, the Kalinga janapada originally comprised the area covered by the Puri and Ganjam districts.

Kalinga dynasty (I) (c. 1100 – 700 BCE) 

According to Mahabharata and some Puranas, the prince 'Kalinga' founded the Kalinga Kingdom, in the current day region of coastal Odisha, including the North Sircars. 

The Mahabharata also mentions one 'Srutayudha' as the king of the Kalinga kingdom, who joined the Kaurava camp. In the Buddhist text, Mahagovinda Suttanta, Kalinga and its ruler, 'Sattabhu', have been mentioned.
Known rulers are-
 King Kalinga, (founder of Kalinga Kingdom)
 King Odra, (founder of Odra Kingdom)
 Srutayudha
 Srutayush
 Manimat
 Chitrangada
 Subahu
 Virasena
 Sudatta
 Nalikira
 Yavanaraj
 Dantavakkha or Dantavakhra (c. 9th century BCE)
 Avakinnayo Karakandu (c. late 9th to early 8th century BCE)
 Vasupala (c. 8th century BCE)

Kalinga dynasty (II) (c. 700 – 350 BCE) 

This dynasty is mentioned in Chullakalinga Jataka and Kalingabodhi Jataka. The last ruler of First Kalinga dynasty is said to have broken away from the Danda kingdom along with the kings of Asmaka and Vidarbha as its feudal states, and established rule of Second Kalinga dynasty.
Known rulers are-
 Dandaki
 Mahakalinga
 Chullakalinga
 Kalinga II (c. 7th – 6th century BCE)

Other or late Kalinga rulers according to Dāṭhavaṃsa are-

This was probably another dynasty or late rulers of Second Kalinga dynasty, which is mentioned in Dāṭhavaṃsa.
Known rulers are-
 Brahmadatta (c. 6th – 5th century BCE)
 Sattabhu
 Kasiraja
 Sunanda
 Guhasiva

Suryavamsha of Kalinga (c. 350 – 261 BCE) 
Known rulers are-
 Brahmaadittiya (c. 4th century BCE)
His son, prince 'Soorudasaruna-Adeettiya' was exiled and as per Maldivian history, established the first kingdom Dheeva Maari and laid the foundation of the Adeetta dynasty.
Unknown rulers
 Unknown (till 261 BCE), ruler of Kalinga at time of Mauryan annexation of Kalinga.

After Kalinga War (261 BCE), Kalinga Kingdom became a part of Mauryan Empire, after which Kalinga Kingdom was succeeded by Mahameghavahana Empire between 230–190 BCE which ruled till 350 CE.

Kalinga under Magadha Empire (c. 345 – 225 BCE)

Under Nanda Empire (c. 345 – 322 BCE) 

Kalinga was believed to be briefly annexed by Mahapadma Nanda.
 Mahapadma Nanda (380–340 BCE)
 Pandhuka
 Panghupati
 Bhutapala
 Rashtrapala
 Govishanaka
 Dashasidkhaka
 Kaivarta
 Mahendra
 Dhana Nanda (322–321 BCE)

When Chandragupta Maurya rebelled against the Nandas, Kalingas broke away from the empire of Magadha.

Under Maurya Empire (c. 261 – 225 BCE) 

Ashoka invaded Kalinga in 261 BCE. Kalinga broke away from the Mauryan empire during the rule of Dasharatha.

 Ashoka (274–232 BCE)
 Dasharatha Maurya (232–224 BCE)

Mahameghavahana Empire (c. 225 BCE – 350 CE) 

Mahamegha Vahana was the founder of the Kalingan Chedi or Cheti Dynasty. The names of Sobhanaraja, Chandraja, Ksemaraja also appear in context. But, Kharavela is the most well known among them. The exact relation between Mahamegha Vahana and Kharavela is not known.
Vasu
Mahamegha Vahana
Sobhanaraja
Chandraja
Ksemaraja
Vakradeva (or) Virdhharaja
Kharavela (c. 193 BCE–155 BCE)
Kudepasiri Vakradeva ll
Vaduka
Galaveya

It is not known that, if Vakadeva was a successor or predecessor of Kharavela. From the inscriptions and coins discovered at Guntupalli and Velpuru, Andhra Pradesh, we know of a series of rulers with the suffix Sada who were possibly distant successors of Kharavela.

 Mana-Sada
 Siri-Sada
 Maha-Sada
 Sivamaka-Sada
 Asaka-Sada

Murunda dynasty (150 – 250 CE) 

Gana (c. 2nd cen CE)
Dhamadamadhara (Dharmatamadharasya) (c. 3rd century CE)

Satavahana Empire (c. 78 – 200 CE)

Gautamiputra Satakarni is known to have invaded Kalinga during his reign.
 Gautamiputra Satkarni (78–102 CE)
 Other rulers
 Sri Yajna Satkarni (170–200 CE)

Pre-classical period

Naga dynasty of Vindhyatabi (225–360)

An inscription dating from 3rd to 4th century found in Asanpat village in Keonjhar revealed the existence of this dynasty. 
 Manabhanja (225–261)
 Satrubhanja (261–340)
 Disabhanja (340–360)

Parvatadvarka dynasty (360–400)

During the same period as the Nalas, the region around modern-day Kalahandi was ruled by them. Not much is known about them.
 Sobhanaraja
 Tustikara

Kings mentioned in Raghuvamsha of Kalidasa 

 Hemangada

Gupta Empire (335–550)

Samudragupta invaded Kalinga during his reign in c.350. By c.571, most of Kalinga had broken away from the Gupta empire.
 Samudragupta (335–380 CE)
 Ramagupta (380)
 Chandragupta II (380–415 CE)
 Kumaragupta I (415–455 CE)
 Skandagupta (455–467 CE)
 Purugupta (467–473 CE)
 Kumaragupta II (473–476)
 Budhagupta (476–495)
 Kumaragupta III (495–500)
 Vishnugupta (500–520)
 Vainyagupta (520–540)
 Bhanugupta (540–550 CE)

Nala dynasty (400–740)

For some time in 4th century, the southern Odisha region around modern-day Koraput, Rayagada, Malkangiri and undivided Bastar, was ruled by the Nalas.

 Vrishadhvaja (400–420 CE)
 Varaharaja (420–440 CE)
 Bhavadattavarman or Bhavadattaraja (441–446 CE)
 Arthapatiraja (446–478)
 Skandavarman (480–515 CE)
Stambha (515–550 CE)
Sri-Nandanaraja (550–585 CE)
Prithviraja (585–625 CE)
Viruparaja (625–660 CE)
Vilasatunga (660–700 CE)
Prthivivyaghra (700–740 CE)

Rajarsitulyakula (4th–6th century CE)

The later half of the 4th century, this dynasty was established in the South Kosala region.
 Maharaja Sura
 Maharaja Dayita I (or Dayitavarman I)
 Maharaja Bhimasena I
 Maharaja Dayitavarman II
 Maharaja Bhimasena II (c. 501 or 601–?)

Sharabhapuriya dynasty (475–590)

Not much is known about this dynasty. Everything known about them, comes from the inscriptions on copper plates and coins. They may or may not have also been known as the Amararyakula dynasty. This dynasty is supposed to have started by one Sarabha, who may have been a feudal chief under the Guptas. They ruled over the modern-day region of Raipur, Bilaspur and Kalahandi.

 Sharabha (Śarabha), c. 475–500 CE
 Narendra, c. 500–525 CE
 Prasanna, c. 525–550 CE
 Jayarāja, c. 550–560 CE
 Sudevarāja, c 560–570 CE
 Manamatra alias Durgarāja, c. 570–580 CE
 Sudevarāja, c. 570–580 CE
 Pravarāja, c. 580–590 CE

Mathara dynasty (4th–5th century CE)

The Mathara dynasty ruled during the 4th and the 5th centuries. The Mathara rulers include:

 Shakti-varman (Śaktivarman)
 Prabhanjana-varman (Prabhañjanavarman)
 Ananta-shakti-varman (Anantaśaktivarman)

Vishnukundina Empire (420–555)

Anantasaktivarman lost southern part of his kingdom to Madhava Varma II and the Matharas never recovered it.
[[File:Vishnukundina Empire map.png
|thumb|Vishnukundina Empire at its height]]

 Madhava Varma I (420–455 CE)
 Indra Varma (455–461)
Madhava Verma II (461–508 CE)
 Vikramendra Varma I (508–528)
 Indra Bhattaraka Varma (528–555 CE)

Indra Bhattaraka Varma possibly lost his Kalinga holdings to one Adiraja Indra, who possibly was Indravarma I of East Ganga Dynasty.

Vigraha dynasty (575–630)
They ruled the region called South Tosali, around modern-day Puri and Ganjam, during second half of 6th century.
 Prithivi Vigraha (575–600)
 Loka Vigraha (c. 600 CE –630)

Mudgalas dynasty (580–620)
They ruled the region of North Toshali, the river Mahanadi served as the border between North and South Toshali. In 603 CE, they captured South Toshali from the Vigrahas.

 Sambhuyasa (c. 580–620)

Durjaya dynasty (620–680)

In mid-6th century CE, a chief, Ranadurjaya, established himself in South Kalinga. Prithivimaharaja probably defeated the Mudgalas by his time.
 Ranadurjaya
 Prithivimaharaja

Post-classical period

Gauda Kingdom
Shashanka invaded and possibly occupied northern parts of Kalinga during his reign around c. 615.
 Shashanka (c. 590–625)
 Manava (c. 625–626)

Shailodbhava dynasty

They ruled from the region ranging from coastal Orissa to Mahanadi and to Mahendragiri in Paralakhemundi. This region was called the Kangoda mandala. Sailobhava, the founder of dynasty, is said to have born of a rock, hence the name Shailodbhava. Sailobhava was the adopted son of one Pulindasena, who was possibly a chieftain. They were possibly the subordinates of Shashanka during Madhavaraja II, then they later rebelled.
 Pulindasena (?)
 Sailobhava (?)
 Dharmaraja I (or Ranabhita)
 Madhavaraja I (or Sainyabita I)
 Ayasobhita I (or Chharamparaja)
 Madhavaraja II (or Madhavavarman) (? – 665 CE)
 Madhyamaraja I (or Ayasobhita II) (665 CE – ?)
 Dharmaraja II

Harsha
Harsha invaded Kalinga and Kangoda, soon after the death Pulakesi II in 642 CE. Madhavaraja II was the vassal of Harsha until the death of later in 647 CE.
 Harsha (606–647)

Bhaumakara dynasty

The Bhauma or Bhauma-Kara Dynasty lasted from c. 736 CE to c. 940 CE. They mostly controlled the coastal areas of Kalinga. But by c.850 CE, they controlled most of modern Orissa. The later part of their reign was disturbed by rebellions from the Bhanja dynasty of the Sonepur and Boudh region.

 Lakshmikaradeva (?)
 Ksemankaradeva (736)
 Sivakaradeva I (or Unmattasimha) (c. 756/786 –?)
 Subhakaradeva I (c. 790 –?)
 Sivakaradeva II (c. 809 –?)
 Santikaradeva I (or Gayada I) (?)
 Subhakaradeva II (c. 836 –?)
 Subhakaradeva III (?–845)
 Tribhuvana Mahadevi I (widow of Santikaradeva I) (c. 845 –?)
 Santikaradeva II (?)
 Subhakaradeva IV (or Kusumahara II) (c. 881 –?)
 Sivakaradeva III (or Lalitahara) (c. 885 –?)
 Tribhuvana Mahadevi II (or Prithivi Mahadevi, widow of Subhakara IV) (c. 894 –?)
 Tribhuvana Mahadevi III (widow of Sivakara III) ?
 Santikaradeva III (?)
 Subhakara V (?)
 Gauri Mahadevi (wife of Subhakara) (?)
 Dandi Mahadevi (daughter of Gauri) (c. 916 or 923 – ?)
 Vakula Mahadevi (stepmother of Dandi Mahadevi) (?)
 Dharma Mahadevi (widow of Santikaradeva) (?)

The mandala states
Between the 8th and 11th centuries, Orissa was divided into mandalas which were feudal states ruled by chieftains. These chieftains swore allegiance to the Bhaumakaras. This period saw the rise of the Bhanja dynasty.

Bhanjas of Khinjali mandala

Early Bhanjas of Khinjali mandala
Silabhanja I (8th cen CE)
Satrubhanja (8th cen CE)
Ranabhanja (9th cen CE)
Netribhanja I (Nettabhanja I)
Digbhanja
Silabhanja II
Vidyadharbhanja
Nettabhanja II

Baudh Bhanjas of Khinjali mandala
Solanabhanja
Durjayabhanja
Kanakabhanja

Later Bhanjas of Khinjali mandala
Devabhaja
Rayabhanja I
Virabhanja
Rayabhanja II
Yasobhanja (12th cen CE)
Jayabhanja (12th cen CE)
Virabhanja II

Bhanjas of Khijjinga mandala
Virabhadra Adi-Bhanja (8th cen CE)
Kottabhanja 
Digbhanja
Rajabanja
Ranabhanja (924 CE Bamanghaty inscription)
Narendrabhanja

Sulkis of Kodalaka Mandala
Kodalaka refers to the modern-day district of Dhenkanal.
 Kanchanastambha who was succeeded by his son Kalahastambha.
 Ranastambha (c.839-?)
 Jayasthambha
 Kulastambha II
Later, the mandala was divided into two parts, Yamagartta Mandala and Airavatta Mandala. The Bhaumas allowed the Tunga and the Nandodbhava families to rule over Yamagartta Mandala and Airavatta Mandala respectively.

Tungas of Yamagartta Mandala
The Mandala refers to the northern part of modern Dhenkanal district. Jayasimha was ruler of the mandala before the Tungas, he was not a member of the Tunga dynasty.
 Jayasimha (c. 864 )
 Khadaga Tunga
 Vinita Tunga
 Solana Tunga
 Gayada Tunga
 Apsara Deva.
It is not clearly known if Apsara Deva belonged to the Tunga family or not.

Nandodbhavas of Airavatta Mandala
This region extended over the territory comprising southern part of Dhenkanal district, some western portion of Cuttack district and almost the entire Nayagarh district.
 Jayananda
 Paramananda
 Sivananda
 Devananda I
 Devananda II (c. 920–?)
 Dhruvananda (c. 929–?)

Mayuras of Banei Mandala
This region roughly comprised the modern-day Banei sub-division and parts of Panposh subdivision of Sundergarh district. 
 Udita Varsha
 Teja Varsha
 Udaya Varsha

Gangas of Svetaka Mandala
The capital of Svetaka known as Svetakapura has been identified with modern Chikiti.

 Jayavarma Deva
 Anantavarman
 Gangaka Vilasa
 Bhupendra Varman
 Mahendravarman
 Prithivarman
 Indravarman I
 Indravarman II
 Samantavarman (c. 909–921?)

Somvanshi (Keshari) dynasty

The Soma or Kesari Dynasty originates in South Kosala, but by the reign of Yayati I, they controlled most of modern Orissa.

 Janmejaya I (c. 882–992)
 Yayati I (c. 922–955)
 Bhimaratha (c. 955–80)
 Dharmarstha (c. 980–1005)
 Nahusa (c. 1005–1021)
 Indranatha (c. 1021–1025)
 Yayati II (c. 1025–1040)
 Udyotakesari (c. 1040–1065)
 Janmejaya II (c. 1065–1080)
 Puranjaya (c. 1080–1090)
 Karnadeva (c. 1090–1110)

Janmejaya, the predecessor of Karnadeva and the son of Janmejaya II, was not considered a ruler by his successors, as he captured the throne in a violent coup and soon-after lost it.

Chindaka Naga dynasty 

The Chindaka Nagas are believed by certain historians to have arrived in the Chakrakota Mandala region (Bastar and Koraput) with the expedition of Rajendra Chola. The Telugu Chodas who invaded the region later, settled as their feudal rulers. This dynasty continued to rule the region till the thirteenth century with not many details known about their rulers excepting a few.

 Nrupati Bhushana (1023– ?)
 Jagadeka Bhushana or Dharavarsha
 Madhurantaka
 Somesvara
 Kanhara

Eastern Ganga dynasty

Indravarman I is earliest known independent king of the dynasty. He is known from the Jirjingi copper plate grant.
 Mittavarman, a feudal Eastern Ganga king under Vakataka rule  (c. ?–?)
Indravarman I (c. ?–537?)
 Samantavarman (c. 537–562)
 Hastivarman (c. 562–578)
 Indravarman II (c. 578–589)
 Danarnava (c. 589–652)
 Indravarman III (c. 589–652)
 Gunarnava (c. 652–682)
 Devendravarman I (c. 652–682?)
 Anantavarman III (c. 808–812?)
 Rajendravarman II (c. 812–840?)
 Devendravarman V (c. 885–895?)
 Gunamaharnava I (c. 895–939?)
 Vajrahasta II (or Anangabhimadeva I) (c. 895–939?)
 Gundama - (c. 939–942)
 Kamarnava I (c. 942–977)
 Vinayaditya (c. 977–980)
 Vajrahasta IV (c. 980–1015)
 Kamarnava II (c. 1015 – 6 months after)
 Gundama II (c. 1015–1038)
 Vajrahasta V (c. 1038–1070)
 Rajaraja Deva I (c. 1070–1077)
 Anantavarman Chodaganga (c. 1077–1147)
 Jatesvaradeva (c. 1147–1156)
 Raghava Deva (c. 1156–1170)
 Rajaraja Deva II (c. 1170–1190)
 Anangabhima Deva II (c. 1190–1198)
 Rajraja Deva III (c. 1198–1211)
 Anangabhima Deva III (c. 1211–1238)
 Narasimha Deva I (1238–1264)
 Bhanu Deva I (1264–1278)
 Narasimha Deva II (1279–1306)
 Bhanu Deva II (1306–1328)
 Narasimha Deva III (1328–1352)
 Bhanu Deva III (1352–1378)
 Narasimha Deva IV (1378–1414)
 Bhanu Deva IV (1414–1434)

Gudari Kataka Eastern Ganga rulers 
According to Gangavansucharitam written in sixteenth or seventeenth century, Bhanu Deva IV also known as Kajjala Bhanu founded a new small princedom in southern Odisha at Gudari in modern Rayagada district after he was toppled from power by his general Kapilendra Deva.

 Kajjala Bhanu or Bhanu Deva IV
 Svarna Bhanu
 Kalasandha Deva
 Chudanga Deva
 Harimani Deva
 Narasimha Deva
 Ananta Deva
 Padmanabha Deva
 Pitambara Deva
 Vasudeva
 Purrushottama Anangabhima Deva or Bhima Deva

Parlakhemundi Ganga rulers 
Parlakhemundi state rulers were the direct descendants of the Eastern Ganga dynasty rulers of Odisha.

 Narasingha Deba (1309–1320)
 Madanrudra Deba (1320–1339)
 Narayana Rudra Deba (1339–1353)
 Ananda Rudra Deba (1353–1354)
 Ananda Rudra Deba (1354–1367)
 Jayarudra Deba (1367–1399)
 Lakhsmi Narasingha Deba (1399–1418)
 Madhukarna Gajapati (1418–1441)
 Murtunjaya Bhanu Deba (1441–1467)
 Madhaba Bhanu Deba (1467–1495)
 Chandra Betal Bhanu Deba (1495–1520)
 Subarnalinga Bhanu Deba (1520–1550)
 Sibalinga Narayan Bhanudeo (1550–1568)
 Subarna Kesari Govinda Gajapati Narayan Deo (1568–1599)
 Mukunda Rudra Gajapati Narayan Deo (1599–1619) 
 Mukunda Deo (1619–1638)
 Ananta Padmanabh Gajapati Narayan Deo I (1638–1648)
 Sarbajgan Jagannatha Gajapati Narayan Deo I (1648–1664)
 Narahari Narayan Deo (1664–1691) 
 Bira Padmanabh Narayan Deo II (1691–1706)
 Prataprudra Gajapati Narayan Deo I (1706–1736)
 Jagannatha Gajapati Narayana Deo II  (1736–1771)
 Goura Chandra Gajapati Narayan Deo I (1771–1803)
 Purushottam Gajapati Narayan Deo (1803–1806)
 Jagannath Gajapati Narayan Deo III (1806–1850)
 Prataprudra Gajapati Narayan Deo II (1850–1885)
 Goura Chandra Gajapati Narayan Deo II (1885–1904)
 Krushna Chandra Gajapati Narayan Deo (1913 – 25 May 1974)
 Gopinath Gajapati Narayan Deo  (25 May 1974 – 10 January 2020)
 Kalyani Gajapati (10 January 2020–present)

Chikiti Ganga rulers 

Historians conclude that the rulers of Chikiti were from the line of Ganga ruler Hastivarman.

 Kesaba Rautara or Bira Karddama Singha Rautara (881-940)
 Balabhadra Rautara (941-997)
 Madhaba Rautara (998-1059)
 Languli Rautara (1060-1094)
 Mohana Rautara (1095-1143)
 Balarama Rautara (1144-1197)
 Biswanatha Rautara (1198-1249)
 Harisarana Rautara (1250-1272)
 Raghunatha Rautara (1273-1313)
 Dinabandhu Rautara (1314-1364)
 Gopinatha Rautara (1365-1417)
 Ramachandra Rautara (1418-1464)
 Narayana Rautara (1465-1530)
 Narasingha Rautara (1531-1583)
 Lokanatha Rautara (1584-1633)
 Jadumani Rautara (1634-1691)
 Madhusudana Rajendra Deba (1692-1736)
 Kulamani Rajendra Deba (1737-1769)
 Krusnachandra Rajendra Deba (1770-1790)
 Pitambara Rajendra Deba (1791-1819)
 Gobindachandra Rajendra Deba (1820-1831)
 Kulamani Rajendra Deba (1832-1835)
 Brundabanachandra Rajendra Deba (1835-1846)
 Jagannatha Rajendra Deba (1847-1855)
 Biswambhara Rajendra Deba (1856-1885)
 Kisorachandra Rajendra Deba (1885-1903)
 Radhamohana Rajendra Deba (1903-1923)
 Gaurachandra Rajendra Deba (1934)
 Sachhidananda Rajendra Deba

Naga dynasty of Kalahandi 

 Raghunath Sai (1005–1040 AD)
 Pratap Narayan Deo (1040–1072 AD)
 Birabar Deo (1072–1108 AD)
 Jugasai Deo I (1108–1142 AD)
 Udenarayan Deo (1142–1173 AD)
 Harichandra Deo (1173–1201 AD)
 Ramachandra Deo (1201–1234 AD)
 Gopinath Deo (1234–1271 AD)
 Balabhadra Deo (1271–1306 AD)
 Raghuraj Deo (1306–1337 AD)
 Rai Singh Deo I (1337–1366 AD)
 Haria Deo (1366–1400 AD)
 Jugasai Deo II (1400–1436 AD)
 Pratap Narayan Deo II (1436–1468 AD)
 Hari Rudra Deo (1468–1496 AD)
 Anku Deo (1496–1528 AD)
 Pratap Deo (1528–1564 AD)
 Raghunath Deo (1564–1594 AD)
 Biswambhar Deo (1594–1627 AD)
 Rai Singh Deo II (1627–1658 AD)
 Dusmant Deo (1658–1693 AD)
 Jugasai Deo III (1693–1721 AD)
 Khadag Rai Deo (1721–1747 AD)
 Rai Singh Deo III (1747–1771 AD)
 Purusottam Deo (1771–1796 AD)
 Jugasai Dei IV (1796–1831 AD)
 Fate Narayan Deo (1831–1853 AD)
 Udit Pratap Deo I (1853–1881 AD)
 Raghu Keshari De (1894–1897 AD)
 Court of Wards (1897–1917 AD)
 Brajamohan Deo (1917–1939 AD)
 Pratap Keshari Deo (1939-1947 AD until the merger with Orissa state)

Early Chauhan rulers 
This Rajput dynasty had arrived from Mainpuri or Garh Sambhor amidst a conflict with the Muslim rulers of Delhi around 13th or 14th century. The founder Ramai Deva was still in the womb of his mother when his father was murdered by the Yavanas and she fled to the hilly and forest terrains of western Odisha to seek refuge. The early 17th-century works by the Poet Gangadhar Mishra (a descendant of the famous Sanskrit poet Sambhukara from Puri) known as Kosalananda and early 18th-century work by the Chauhan king Vaijala Deva known as Probodha Chandrika and Jayachandrika give detailed descriptions about their origins and foundation of the state first at Patna and then Sambalpur.

Ramai Deva was first adopted by a local priest or Brahmin chief known as Chakradhara Panigrahi who provided shelter and refuge to his fleeing mother during her pregnancy. Ramai Deva later won over other local chiefs and established the Patna state. He married the daughter of the Eastern Ganga King Bhanudeva III

Patna (Bolangir) 

Ramai Deva (1360-1380)
Mahalinga Deva (1380-1385)
Vatsaraja Deva (1385-1410)
Vaijala Deva I (1410-1430)
Bhojaraj Deva (1430-1455)
Pratap Rudra Deva I (1455-1480)
Bhupal Deva I (1480-1500)
Vikramaditya Deva I (1500-1520)
Vaijal Deva II (1520-1540)
Bajra Hiradhara Deva (1540-1570)
Narsingh Deva (1570-1577)
Hamir Deva (1577-1581)
Pratap Deva II (1581-1620)
Vikramaditya Deva II (1620-1640)
Mukunda Deva (1640-1670)
Balaram Deva (1670-1678)
Hrdesha Deva (1678-1685)
Rai Singh Deva (1685-1762)
Prithviraj Deva (1762-1765)
Ramchandra Singh Deo I (1765-1820)
Bhupal Singh Deo (1820-1848)
Hiravajra Singh Deo (1848-1866)
Pratap Singh Deo (1866-1878)
Ramchandra Singh Deo II (1878-1895)
Lal Dalganjan Singh Deo (1895-1910)
Prithviraj Singh (1910-1924)
Rajendra Narayan Singh Deo (1924-1948)

Sambalpur 

Balarama Deva (1570 - 1595 CE)
Hrdayanarayana Deva (1595 - 1605)
Balabhadra Deva (1605 - 1630)
Madhukar Deva (1630-1660)
Baliara Deva (1650-1688)
Ratan Singh (1688 - 1690)
Chhatra Sai (1690 - 1725)
Ajit Singh (1725 - 1766)
Abhaya Singh (1766-1778)
Balabhadra Singh (1778 - 1781)
Jayanta Singh (1781 - 1818)
Maharaj Sai (1820 - 1827)
Rani Mohan Kumari (f) (1827 - 1833)
Narayan Singh (1833 - 1849)
Surendra Sai (in rebellion) (1857 - 1862)

Medieval period

Gajapati Empire (Suryavamsa dynasty)
 Kapilendra Deva (1435–67)
 Purushottama Deva (1467–97)
 Prataparudra Deva (1497–1540)
  Ramachandra Deva
  Purushottam Deva

Govinda Vidyadhara, the general of Prataparudra, killed Prataparudra's remaining sons in c. 1541 and began the Bhoi dynasty.

Early Bhoi dynasty
 Govinda Vidyadhara (1541–1548)
 Chakrapratapa (1548–1557)
 Narasimha Ray Jena (1557–1558)
 Raghuram Ray Chotaraya (1558–1560)

Bhoi dynasty was short-lived but during their reign, Orissa came into conflicts with the invaders from Golconda. After being deposed by Mukunda Deva, the dynasty shifts its power centre to Khurda where they continue as Rajas of Khurda.

Chalukya dynasty (Kalinga)
Mukunda Deva come to throne but his reign was cut short by the armies of Sulaiman Khan Karrani which were led by Kalapahad.
 Mukunda Deva (1560–68)

Post-medieval period

Karranis of Bengal
Instigated by Mukunda Deva's alliance with Akbar, Sulaiman's army led by Kalapahad invaded Orissa in 1568. The Karranis of Bengal had control over much of Northern Odisha coast above Cuttack, while the Bhoi dynasty established the Khurda Kingdom and the Garhjat Kings had control over much of the interior regions of Odisha.
 Sulaiman Khan Karrani (1568–1572)
 Bayazid Khan Karrani (1572)
 Daud Khan Karrani (1572–12 July 1576)
In the Battle of Tukaroi, which took place in modern-day Balasore, Daud was defeated and retreated deep into Orissa. The battle led to the Treaty of Katak in which Daud ceded the whole of Bengal and Bihar, retaining only Odisha. The treaty eventually failed after the death of Munim Khan (governor of Bengal and Bihar) who died at the age of 80. Sultan Daud Khan took the opportunity and invaded Bengal. This would lead to the Battle of Raj Mahal in 1576.

Mughal Empire
 Qutlu Khan Lohani (former officer of Daud Khan Karrani, ruler of coastal Northeastern Orissa and south Bengal) (1576-1590)
 Nasir Khan (son of Qutlu Khan, Mughal vassal) (1590–1592)
 Man Singh I (Mughal Subahdar) (1592–1606)

Man Singh I attacked Nasir Khan when the later broke a treaty by attacking the temple town of Puri. Orissa was annexed into the Bengal subah (province).The Mughal rule was weak in the region, this allowed local chieftains to somewhat enjoy a semi-independence.

Nawab of Bengal
By 1717, with the weakening of Mughal Empire following Mughal–Maratha Wars in which the Marathas became the dominant power in the subcontinent, the Bhoi dynasty of Khurda kingdom and the semi-autonomous Garhjat kings of Odisha became independent of the Mughal sovereign authority, while the Nawabs of Bengal retained control over the Northern coast of Odisha from Cuttack to Subarnarekha river until the region was finally conquered by the Maratha Empire starting from the invasion in 1741 by 1751.
 Murshid Quli Khan (Nawab of Bengal) (1717-1727)
 Shuja-ud-Din (Nawab of Bengal) (1727–1739)
 Sarfaraz Khan (Nawab of Bengal) (1727 and 1739–1740)
 Alivardi Khan (Nawab of Bengal) (1740–1751)

The Nawabs of Bengal controlled the controlled the Northern Odisha coast from Cuttack to Subarnarekha river which was conquered by the Marathas and eventually ceded following the peace treaty in 1751.

Maratha Empire
The Maratha Empire general, Raghoji I Bhonsle of the Nagpur kingdom led the Maratha expeditions in Bengal in 1741 which extended Maratha control over Odisha and signed a treaty with Alivardi Khan in 1751, ceding the perpetuity of Cuttack up to the river Suvarnarekha to the Marathas.
 Raghoji I Bhonsle (Maratha general of Nagpur) (1741/51–1755)
 Janoji Bhonsle (1755–1772)
 Mudhoji Bhonsle (1772–1788)
 Raghoji II Bhonsle (1788–1803)

Maratha administrators
 Mir Habib (1751–1752)
 Mirza Saleh (1752–1759)
 Seo Bhatt Sathe (1760–1764) 
 Bhawani Pandit (1764–1768)
 Sambhaji Ganesh (1768–1770)
 Babuji Naik (1770–1773)
 Madhaji Hari (1773–1777)
 Rajaram Pandit (1778–1793)
 Sadashiv Rao (1793–1803)

Later Bhanj dynasty states

Mayurbhanj 

Adi Bhanj (?Adi Bhanj II of the Bhanj dynasty) (12th cen CE)
...
Savesvara Bhanj Deo (1688 – 1711)
Viravikramaditya Bhanj Deo (1711 – 1728)
Raghunath Bhanj Deo (1728 – 1750)
Chakradhar Bhanj Deo (1750 – 1761)
Damodar Bhanj Deo (1761 – 1796)
Rani Sumitra Devi (f) - Regent of Mayurbhanj (1796 – 1810)
Rani Jamuna Devi  (f) - Regent of Mayurbhanj (1810 - 1813)
Tribikram Bhanj Deo (1813 – 1822)
Jadunath Bhanj Deo (1822 – 1863)
Shrinath Bhanj Deo (1863 – 1868) 
Krishna Chandra Bhanj Deo (1868 – 29 May 1882)
Sriram Chandra Bhanj Deo (29 May 1882 –  22 February 1912)
Purna Chandra Bhanj Deo (22 February 1912 – 21 April 1928)
Pratap Chandra Bhanj Deo (21 Apr 1928 – 1 January 1948)

Keonjhar 

Jyoti Bhanj (12th cen CE)
...
Jagannath Bhanj (1688 - 1700)
Raghunath Bhanj (1700 - 1719)
Gopinath Bhanj (1719 - 1736)
Narsingh Narayan Bhanj (1736 - 1757)
Daneswar Narayan Bhanj (1757 - 1758)
Jagateswar Narayan Bhanj (1758 - 1762)
Pratap Balbhadra Bhanj (1762 - 1794)
Janardan Bhanj (1794 - 1825)
Gadadhar Narayan Bhanj Deo (1825 - 22 March 1861) 
Dhanurjai Narayan Bhanj Deo (4 September 1861 – 27 October 1905)
Gopinath Narayan Bhanj Deo (27 Oct 1905 – 12 August 1926)
Balbhadra Narayan Bhanj Deo (12 Aug 1926 – 1 January 1948)

Nilgiri 

Narayan Singh Bhujang Mandhata Birat Basant Harichandan (1521-1564)
...
Ram Chandra Mardraj Harichandan (1797-1832)
Govind Chandra Mardraj Harichandan (1832-1833)
Chira Devi - Rani (1833-1843)
Krishna Chandra Mardraj Harichandan (1843-1893)
Shyam Chandra Mardraj Harichandan (1893-6 Jul 1913) (from the Bhanj dynasty of Mayurbhanj State)
Kishor Chandra Mardraj Harichandan (6 July 1913-1 January 1948)

Baudh 

The Baudh princely state had gradually become a small state after it had ceded away large sways of territories in the west and south to the Chauhans of Sambalpur and Daspalla region in Nayagarh which became a separate Bhanja princely state later.

Ananga Bhanja (Ananga Deba) (14th cen CE)
...
Siddhabhanja Deba (Siddheswar Deba) (1640s)
Pratap Deba
Bswambhar Deba (1778-1817)
Chandrasekhar Deba (1817-1839)
Pitamber Deo (1839-5 October 1879)
Jogendra Deo (5 October 1879-1913)
Narayan Prasad Deo (1913-1 January 1948)

Daspalla 

The Daspalla Bhanja state was established by Sal Bhanja from the territories gifted to his father Narayan Bhanja Deo by his brother, the ruler of Baudh.

Naren Bhanja (1498 CE)
...
Chakradhar Deo Bhanja (1653–1701)
Padmanav Deo Bhanja (1701–1753)
Trilochan Deo Bhanja (1753–1775)
Makunda Bhank Deo Bhanja (1775–1795)
Guri Charan Deo Bhanja (1795–1805)
Krishna Chanda Deo Bhanja (1805–1845)
Madhusudan Deo Bhanja (1845–1861)
Narsimha Deo Bhanja (1861–1873)
Chaitan Deo Bhanja (1873–19 April 1897)
Narayan Deo Bhanja (19 April 1897–11 Dec 1913)
Kishor Chandra Deo Bhanja (11 December 1913–1 January 1948)

Nandapur-Jeyore rulers

Silavamshi rulers of Nandapur
Silavamshi rulers are said to be the descendants of the Saila Vanshi rulers from Nadivardhana region near today's Nagpur.

 Ganga Raja (1353–??)
 Viswanadha Raja or Bhairava Raja
 Pratap Ganga Raja (??–1443)

Jeypore Estate

The founder of Jeypore Suryavanshi dynasty married the daughter of the last Silavanshi ruler of Nandapur Pratap Ganga Raj and became an heir to the throne. With the decline of the Gajapati monarchs, the kingdom came under the influence of Golconda rulers and by 18th century due to conflicts, the region suffered major backlash on the northern and eastern parts as they came under the reign of Marathas and the independence of Vizianagaram rulers on the coast who became the founder of the Vizianagaram estate and the region eventually came under British rule. 

 Vinayak Deo  (1443–1476)
 Vijay Chandraksha Deo (1476v1510)
 Bhairava Deo (1510–1527)
 Vishwanatha Deo Gajapati (1527–1571)
 Balarama Deo (1571–1597)
 Yeshovanta Deo (1597–1610)
 Krishna Deo (1610–1648)
 Veer Vikram Deo  (1648–1669)
 Krishna Deo (1669–1672)
 Vishwambhara Deo I (1672–1676)
 Mallakimardhana Krishna Deo (1676–1681)
 Hari Deo (1681–1684)
 Balarama Deo I (1684–1686)
 Raghunath Krishna Deo (1686–1708)
 Ramchandra Deo I (1708–1711)
 Balarama Deo II (1711–1713)
 Vishwambhara Deo II (1713–?)
 Lala Krishna Deo (1752–1758)
 Vikram Deo I (1758–1779)
 Ramchandra Deo II (1779–1825)
 Vikram Deo II (1825–1860)
 Ramchandra Deo III (1860–1889)
 Vikram Deo III (1889–1920)
 Ramchandra Deo IV (1920–1931)
 Vikram Deo IV (1931–1951)

Later Chauhan rulers

Sonepur 

The territory of Sonepur was procured by the Chauhans of Sambalpur from the Bhanja kings of Baudh.

Madan Gopal (1650 - 1680 CE)
Lal Sai Deo (1680 - 1689)
Purusottam Deo (1689 – 1709)
Raj Singh Deo (1709 – 1729)
Achal Singh Deo (1729 – 1749)
Divya Singh Deo (1749 – 1766)
Jarawar Singh Deo (1766 – 1767)
Sobha Singh Deo (1767 – 1781)
Prithvi Singh Deo (1781 – 1841)
Niladhar Singh Deo (1841 – 11 September 1891)
Pratap Rudra Singh (11 September 1891 – 8 August 1902)
Bir Mitrodaya Singh Deo (8 August 1902 – 29 April 1937)
Sudhansu Shekhar Singh Deo (29 April 1937 – 1 January 1948)

Khariar 
The third branch of Chauhan rulers descended in the line of Patna's Ramai Deva started their separate rule from Khariar in the seventeenth century.

 Gopal Rai (1600–1625)
 Ramsai Deo I
 Padman Rai
 Vishnu Rai
 Ghansi Rai Deo
 Gopinath Sai Deo
 Ramsai Deo II
 Balabhadra Sai
 Prataprudra Singh (1793–1818)
 Ratan Singh Deo (1818–1835)
 Sudarsan Singh Deo (1835–1849)
 Krishna Chandra Singh Deo (1849–1867)
 Padma Singh Deo (1867–1889)
 Brajraj Singh Deo (1889–1907)
 Vir Vikram Singh Deo (1907–1913)
 Artatran Singh Deo (1913–1946)
 Anup Singh Deo (1946 – until accession)

Later Bhoi dynasty

Khurda
After 1576 following the wars between the Afghans and Mughals which ended with the victory of the Mughals, and with the advent of Mughal rule in Odisha in 1592, the centre of power of Bhoi dynasty had shifted from Cuttack to Khurda. They continue to remain as vassal of the Mughal empire from 1592 until 1717 and later under the Maratha empire from 1741 until they were eventually ceded to the British empire under the control of the British East India Company in 1803 following the Second Anglo-Maratha War with the signing of the Treaty of Deogaon.

 Ramachandra Deva I (Abhinav Indradyumna) (1568-1600)
 Purusottam Deva (1600–1621)
 Narasingha Deva (1621–1647)
 Balabhadra Deva (1647–1657)
 Mukunda Deva I (1657–1689)
 Divyasingha Deva I (1689 – 1716)
 Harekrushna Deva (1716–1720)
 Gopinath Deva (1720–1727)
 Ramachandra Deva II (1727–1736)
 Birakesari Deva I (Bhagirathi Deva) (1736–1793)
 Divyasingha Deva II (1793–1798)
 Mukundeva Deva II (1798-1804) (titular till 1809)

The Rajas of Khurda continued to rule the region well into the early 1800s but by then their power had diminished. Then the Raja of Khurda along with other local chieftain led a series of rebellions against the British which was suppressed in 1804 and the kingdom was annexed by the British. The Raja of Khurda was exiled but later reinstated and shifted to Puri in 1809.

Puri

 Mukundeva Deva II (1809-1817) (reinstated and continues as Raja of Puri)
 Ramchandra Deva III (1817-1854)
 Birakesari Deva II (1854-1859)
 Divyasingha Deva III (1859-1882)
 Mukundeva Deva III (1882-1926)
 Ramchandra Deva IV (1926-1956)
 Birakisore Deva III (1956-1970)
 Divyasingha Deva IV (1970-current)

British colonial period
Mukundeva Deva II was discontent under Maratha rule, so he agreed to help British troops to march through his territory without resistance. In 1803, Maratha ceded Orissa to the British empire. The Rajas and other local chieftains lead a series of rebellions against the British. Notable among the rebellions is that of Surendra Sai.

Odia speaking people at this time were placed in different provinces. Around 1870, a movement was started to unify the Oriya-speaking 
within a state. In 1936, the new state of Orissa was formed. About 25 princely states, remained independent but they were later integrated by 1947, except Saraikela, Kharsawan, Bastar, Parlakhemundi Zamindari (rest of today's Vijayanagaram). 

See: List of Governors of Bihar and Orissa
See: Prime Minister of Orissa

Lieutenant Governors and Governors of Bihar and Orissa Province
 Sir Charles Stuart Bayley (1912-1915)
 Sir Edward Albert Gait (1915-1918) & (1918-1920)
 Sir Edward Vere Levinge (acting) (1918)
 Satyendra Prasanna Sinha, 1st Baron Sinha (1920-1921)
 Havilland Le Mesurier (acting) (1921-1922)
 Sir Henry Wheeler (1922-1927)
 Sir Hugh Lansdown Stephenson (1927-1932)
 Sir James David Sifton (1932-1936)

Governors of Orissa Province
 Sir John Austen Hubback (1936-1938) & (1938-1941)
 George Townsend Boag (Acting) (1938)
 Sir Hawthorne Lewis (1941-1946)
 Chandulal Madhavlal Trivedi (1946-1947)

Prime Minister of Orissa Province
 Krushna Chandra Gajapati (1937) & (1941-1944)
 Bishwanath Das (1937-1939)
 Harekrushna Mahatab (1946-1947)

Post Independence
See: List of Governors of Odisha
See: List of Chief Ministers of Odisha

See also
 History of Orissa
 Maritime history of Orissa

References

Bibliography 

 

 

Odisha-related lists
History of Odisha
India history-related lists
Lists of Indian monarchs